Greek Cypriot singer Ivi Adamou has released two studio albums, two extended plays and 15 singles. Ivi secured a recording contract with Sony Music Greece and released her debut extended play, Kalokairi Stin Kardia, which was certified gold. In the same year she collaborated with the Spiros Lambrou Choir and released the holiday EP Christougenna Me Tin Ivi Adamou, released as Christmas with Ivi Adamou abroad.

After her success with the Eurovision song "La La Love" in Cyprus, Greece, Sweden, and Spain, she is preparing a new album including a new single with the Spanish DJ Marsal Ventura, "Time to Love" and "Ase Me". Ivi had a second collaboration with Stavento with the song "Na Sou Tragoudo" since their first collaboration with "San Erthi I Mera" became a big hit in Greece and Cyprus.

Albums

Studio albums

EPs

Singles

As lead artist

As featured artist

Music videos

See also 
 Ivi Adamou
 List of songs recorded by Ivi Adamou

References

Discography
Adamou